Pipeline from Telestream is a network video capture and playout hardware device that is used to move SDI and tape-based video and audio in and out of file-based workflows.  It is also known as an encoder and capturing system for QuickTime and Final Cut Pro.

Pipeline has been used as the main video capture device by "renowned producer and editor, Mitch Jacobson" for "two recent major live events: an Elton John concert and a Guitar Hero publicity launch for Aerosmith.

Specifications
 Network-accessible SDI video capture and playout devices
 Encode to multiple HD and/or SD formats in a single box
 Edit or transcode media files while they are being captured
 Schedule automated live ingest or log from tape
 Sits on your network – so anyone can access it
 Real-time, reliable hardware encoding

External links
 Telestream Home
 Telestream Products

References

Networking hardware